Joginder Singh (born 11 July 1980) is an Indian cricketer who plays for Delhi. He was born in Delhi. He was brought by Delhi Daredevils for the 2010 Indian Premier League.

References

1980 births
Delhi Capitals cricketers
Living people
Delhi cricketers
Indian cricketers